The Deputy Commissioner of Police is the deputy head of the Singapore Police Force (SPF).

Deputy Commissioners of Police

References

Singapore Police Force
Police ranks